Papilio ambrax, the Ambrax butterfly, is a butterfly of the family Papilionidae. It is found in Queensland, Australia, as well as the Aru Islands, Papua (Indonesia), and Papua New Guinea.

The larvae feed on Citrus species, Clausena brevistyla, Limonia acidissima, Microcitrus garrawayae, Microcitrus inodora, Murraya koenigii, Zanthoxylum ailanthoides, Zanthoxylum brachyacanthum, Zanthoxylum nitidum, Zanthoxylum ovalifolium, and Morinda citrifolia.

Subspecies
Papilio ambrax ambrax (western Irian to Papua)
Papilio ambrax dunali Montrouzier, 1856 (Woodlark Island)
Papilio ambrax epirus Wallace, 1865 (Aru)
Papilio ambrax epigius Miskin, 1876 (north-eastern coast of Queensland)
Papilio ambrax artanus Rothschild, 1908 (Mefor, Geelvink Bay)

Taxonomy
Papilio ambrax is a member of the polytes species group. The clade members are:

Papilio polytes Linnaeus, 1758
Papilio ambrax Boisduval, 1832
Papilio phestus Guérin-Méneville, 1830

External links
Australian Faunal Directory
Australian Insects
Butterfly Corner Images from Naturhistorisches Museum Wien

ambrax
Butterflies described in 1832